The Church of All Saints in Closworth, Somerset, England was built in the 13th century. It is a Grade II* listed building.

History

The church was built in the 13th century and added to in the 15th. It underwent a Victorian restoration in 1875.

The parish is part of the Coker Ridge benefice within the Diocese of Bath and Wells.

Architecture

The hamstone building has clay tile roofs. It consists of a four-bay nave and single-bay chancel. The four-stage west tower is supported by angle buttresses.

Inside the church are a 17th-century wooden pulpit and 15th century octagonal font.

In the churchyard is the shaft from a 15th-century hamstone cross.

Thomas Purdue, of the famous Purdue bell-founding family, is buried in the churchyard.

See also  
 List of ecclesiastical parishes in the Diocese of Bath and Wells

References

Grade II* listed buildings in South Somerset
Grade II* listed churches in Somerset
Church of England church buildings in South Somerset